Mostafa Mohamed Hesham El Gamel (born 1 October 1988 in Giza) is an Egyptian athlete. He competed for Egypt in hammer throw at the 2012 Summer Olympics.

Competition record

References

External links
 

1988 births
Living people
Sportspeople from Giza
Egyptian male hammer throwers
Olympic athletes of Egypt
Athletes (track and field) at the 2012 Summer Olympics
World Athletics Championships athletes for Egypt
Mediterranean Games gold medalists for Egypt
Athletes (track and field) at the 2013 Mediterranean Games
African Games gold medalists for Egypt
African Games medalists in athletics (track and field)
Mediterranean Games medalists in athletics
Athletes (track and field) at the 2011 All-Africa Games
Athletes (track and field) at the 2015 African Games
Athletes (track and field) at the 2019 African Games
African Championships in Athletics winners
Islamic Solidarity Games medalists in athletics
Islamic Solidarity Games competitors for Egypt
Athletes (track and field) at the 2020 Summer Olympics
Athletes (track and field) at the 2022 Mediterranean Games
21st-century Egyptian people